Leonce und Lena is a 1979 opera by Paul Dessau after the play Leonce und Lena by Georg Büchner.

Recording
König Peter: Reiner Süß, Leonce: Eberhard Büchner, Lena: Carola Nossek, Valerio: Peter Menzel, Gouvernante: Edda Schaller,  Otmar Suitner

References

Operas by Paul Dessau
German-language operas
Operas
1979 operas
Operas based on plays
Adaptations of works by Georg Büchner